Songkhla Malay (or referred to as Pasa Nayu Singgora by the speakers) is a local variety Malay spoken in Songkhla Province, Thailand. Songkhla Malay was formed because of a mixture of Malay and Thai language and culture. This language is considered to be part of Kelantan-Pattani Malay which is spoken on the Malaysia-Thailand border.

Distribution
Songkhla Malay is spoken in the southern districts of Songkhla Province. By speakers this language is called Pasa Nayu Singgora or in the Standard Malay is called Bahasa Melayu Singgora and the speaker is called Oghae Nayu Singgora (Songkhla Malays). It is spoken in Saba Yoi District, Thepha, Na Thawi, Chana, Sadao, and also spoken on a small scale in Khlong Hoi Khong, Hat Yai, Na Mom, Mueang Songkhla, and Singhanakhon.

Usages

If Thai is the national language in Thailand, then the Nayu language is ethnic minority language Malays (hereinafter referred to as Nayu) Thailand which implies religious meaning and describes their Malay culture. This is not undeniable considering the habits of the Malays, one of which is reflected in culture, is one of the products of language users in addition to its cultural and ethnic significance those who have the status of principal in the environment the community said (Kramsch, 1998: 6).
 
Symbolically, the Nayu language becomes an element the best differentiator between Malay-Muslim communities and other Thai. Nayu language is also considered to be an exclusive communication tool for native speakers in the home area, villages, Malay festivals, religious functions such as wedding ceremonies, commemoration of the birth of the Prophet Muhammad, and so on. Even though Nayu language is not domain language in Thailand, Nayu people often use it in communication daily activities in the family environment, the community around the place of residence, the market, places Malay traditional religious education, most workplaces is a Muslim-Malay private institution, except when they are dealing with co-workers who speak mother Thai (Munirah, 2018: 66).

References

 

Austronesian languages
Malay language
Languages of Thailand
Songkhla